Whispering Willows is an indie adventure horror video game developed by the independent developer Night Light Interactive, and published by Akupara Games. It was released on Ouya on May 27, 2014, and subsequently released for Microsoft Windows, Linux, and OS X on Steam on July 9, 2014 and on Nintendo Switch on September 27, 2018. The game was translated into Spanish, German, French, Italian, Russian, Polish, Chinese, Ukrainian and Brazilian Portuguese. The soundtrack by Steve Goldshein was released on January 9, 2018 by video game music label Materia Collective.

Gameplay
The player takes control of Elena Elkhorn who wants to rescue her father. With her pendant, she can access her shamanic powers: the ability to leave her physical body and explore the world in spirit form. Using this ability, she can fly through gaps in walls and reach new places. The player can also possess certain objects, such as levers, to manipulate the environment. Throughout the game, the player finds notes from ghosts, which reveal new things. To advance in the game, the player has to find items and use them on certain objects.

Plot
Young Elena Elkhorn embarks on a harrowing journey to find her missing father and discover the secrets of the Willows Mansion. Aiding her journey is a unique amulet she received from her father, which allows her to astrally project her spirit into a ghostly realm and communicate with the dead.

Characters
Elena Elkhorn: The protagonist who wants to rescue her father.
John Elkhorn: Elena's missing father and descendant of the Kwantako tribe.
Wortham Willows: The antagonist. He was the mayor of the city and searched for a way to revive his dead wife. 
Flying Hawk: A shaman who wanted to have a peaceful meeting with the white men.
Darby O'Halloran: An old friend of Wortham's. He is haunted by the memories of Sky Flower, a little girl he once killed.
Fleur le Rue: Wortham's secret new love affair.

Development
The game was funded via Kickstarter. With 750 backers and $20,747 the game exceeded its initial goal of $15,000. Michael Johnson created a live-action trailer for the game's release. Skyler Davenport recorded voice acting for the role of Elena.

Reception

Whispering Willows received "mixed or average" reviews according to video game review aggregator Metacritic. Critics praised the game's visuals with Shuva Raha from Adventure Gamers saying that the game is "good-looking" and Electronic Gaming Monthly reviewer Mollie Patterson calling the game's graphics "great". However reviewers noted the boring gameplay with Shuva Raha saying that "the simplistic – often to the point of boring – gameplay, along with poor design that attempts to prolong playing time by inserting hours of completely avoidable backtracking, reduces the experience to a grind".

Awards
Whispering Willows has won the following awards:
 Casual Connect Indie Prize - Winner 2014 for "Best Story," Finalist for "Best Desktop Game" and "Best Art"
 Seattle Indie Gaming Competition - Winner 2014
 OUYA CREATE Game Jam - Winner 2013 for "Most Immersive," Finalist for "Grand Prize" and "Best Visuals"
 Captivate Conference Game Design Competition – Finalist 2013
 Cerebral Indie Developer Grant – Winner 2013

Sequel
In an interview, Logan said that a sequel might be possible, depending on how the game does on consoles. They already started preplanning for the continuation of the story.

References

Further reading
 Night Light Interactive to begin accepting digital currencies for Whispering Willows on November 20, 2014

External links 
 

2014 video games
Adventure games
Android (operating system) games
Indie video games
IOS games
Linux games
MacOS games
Ouya games
PlayStation 4 games
PlayStation Network games
PlayStation Vita games
Single-player video games
Video games about ghosts
Video games developed in the United States
Video games featuring female protagonists
Windows games
Wii U eShop games
Xbox One games
Nintendo Switch games
Akupara Games games